Ernest Fritzevich Appoga (1898 – November 28, 1937) was a Soviet general and revolutionary who was given the position of Komkor on November 11, 1935. He was born in present-day Latvia. He fought in the Russian Civil War in the Soviet Red Army. He was a recipient of the Order of the Red Banner and the Order of the Red Star (1936). 

During the Great Purge, as a part of the so-called "Latvian Operation", he was arrested on either May 22 or 23, 1937 and executed on either 26 or 28 October in Moscow. He was rehabilitated in 1956.

Biography
He was born in 1898 in Libau, Governorate of Livonia, Russian Empire. He became a member of the Bolshevik Party in 1917.

Until 1917 he worked as a machinist polisher at factories in Libau, Petrograd, Lysva. A participant in the February and October Revolutions, a member of the Red Guard, was elected to the Council of working deputies. During the Civil war, he fought against the forces of Kolchak and Denikin. He held the posts of Commissar Cherdynsky Krai, Commissioner of the Ural Military District headquarters, Commissar 38th Rifle Division, Chief of Staff of the 9th Kuban Army. From June to July 1920, he was chief of staff of the 10th Army.
After the end of the Civil War, the Assistant Chief of staff of the North Caucasian Military District, chief of staff, 37 Novocherkassk Rifle Division. Since March 1923-assistant commander of the 9th Don Rifle Division. In 1924, he graduated from the higher academic courses at the Military Academy of Army.

From May 1924, he was the head of the training department of the Army. From November 1924, he was an assistant inspector for-training. Since March 1925-Chief of the Moscow Military District.
In 1925-1927, he was a member of the basic faculty of the Military Academy of M. Frunze. Until April 1928, he was at the disposal of the General Directorate of Army. From April 1928 to July 1930, he was secretary of the regulatory meetings of the USSR Labour and Defence Council.

In 1930-1937, the head of the 3rd Directorate (department) of the Headquarters (General Staff) army is the chief of Military Communications Army. Since March 1933 he served as chief of the Department of Military Communications at the Army Military Transport Academy. Member of the military council in the People Defence of the USSR.

He lived in Moscow at: Potapovskij Alley, House 9/11, apartment 87.
Arrested on either May 22 or May 23 of 1937 on charges of "participating in the fascist-Soviet military conspiracy and sabotage". The Military Collegium of the Supreme Court of the USSR, on November 28 (or November 26) of 1937, sentenced him to be shot, which was carried out the same day at the Kommunarka shooting ground. On April 18, 1956 he was posthumously rehabilitated by the Military Collegium.

Awards
Order of the Red Banner (February 20, 1928)
Order of the Red Star (1936)

References

Bibliography

1898 births
1937 deaths
Military personnel from Liepāja
People from Courland Governorate
Old Bolsheviks
Soviet komkors
Latvian revolutionaries
Soviet military personnel of the Russian Civil War
Recipients of the Order of the Red Banner
Latvian Operation of the NKVD
People executed by the Soviet Union by firearm
Members of the Communist Party of the Soviet Union executed by the Soviet Union
Great Purge victims from Latvia
Soviet rehabilitations